There are over 160 species in the genus Acer.  Species with evergreen foliage are tagged #. Species and sections that are extinct are tagged with †.

Species A-Z
The following is a list of species ordered alphabetically. This is as accepted in September 2015 by the Plant List, which is maintained by Kew Botanical Garden in London, with additions from paleobotanical literature.

Species A

Acer acuminatum  
†Acer alaskense  
Acer amamiense  
Acer amplum 
Acer argutum 
†Acer ashwilli

Species B

Acer barbinerve 
†Acer beckianum  
Acer brachystephyanum
†Acer browni 
Acer buergerianum

Species C

Acer caesium  
Acer calcaratum  
Acer caloneurum
Acer campbellii
Acer campestre 
Acer capillipes 
Acer cappadocicum  
Acer carpinifolium
†Acer castorrivularis  
Acer caudatifolium  
Acer caudatum 
Acer ceriferum 
†Acer chaneyi  
Acer chapaense  
Acer chiangdaoense  
Acer cinerascentiforme  
Acer circinatum  
Acer cissifolium
†Acer clarnoense   
Acer confertifolium 
Acer cordatum  
Acer coriaceifolium 
Acer crassum  
Acer crataegifolium

Species D
  
Acer davidii  
†Acer dettermani  
Acer diabolicum  
Acer discolor  
Acer distylum 
†Acer douglasense  
Acer duplicatoserratum

Species E
  
Acer elegantulum 
Acer emeiense 
†Acer eonegundo  
Acer erianthum  
Acer erythranthum  
Acer eucalyptoides
†Acer ezoanum

Species F-J

Acer fabri  
Acer fengii 
Acer fenzelianum 
Acer foveolatum 
†Acer ferrignoi Wolfe & Tanai
Acer forrestii
Acer garrettii  
Acer ginnala
Acer glabrum 
Acer gracilifolium 
Acer granatense  
Acer griseum  
Acer guanense  
Acer guizhouense 
Acer hainanense  
Acer heldreichii  
Acer henryi
†Acer hillsi Wolfe & Tanai  
Acer huangpingense  
Acer hyrcanum  
†Acer ivanofense Wolfe & Tanai
Acer japonicum  
Acer jingdongense

Species K-O

†Acer kenaicum Wolfe & Tanai 
Acer laevigatum  
Acer laisuense  
Acer lanpingense
†Acer latahense Wolfe & Tanai
Acer laurinum  
Acer lauyuense  
Acer laxiflorum
Acer legonsanicum  
Acer leipoense  
Acer leptophyllum  
Acer lichuanense 
†Acer lincolnense Wolfe & Tanai
Acer linganense 
Acer lobelii
Acer longipedicellatum 
Acer longipes  
Acer lucidum  
Acer macrophyllum  
Acer mairei 
Acer mandshuricum  
Acer mapienense  
Acer maximowiczianum
Acer maximowiczii 
Acer mazandaranicum  
Acer medogense
Acer metcalfii
Acer miaoshanicum  
Acer micranthum  
Acer mirabile  
Acer miyabei  
Acer monspessulanum  
Acer morifolium  
Acer nayongense  
Acer negundo
Acer nigrum Acer saccharum subsp. nigrum(?)
Acer nipponicum Hara
Acer oblongum  
Acer obtusifolium  
Acer okamotoi  
Acer oligocarpum 
Acer olivaceum  
Acer oliverianum 
Acer opalus

Species P

†Acer palaeorufinerve 
Acer palmatum
Acer pauciflorum  
Acer paxii 
Acer pectinatum  
Acer pehpeiense  
Acer pensylvanicum  
Acer pentaphyllum  
Acer pentapomicum  
Acer pictum  
Acer pilosum  
Acer platanoides  
Acer pluridens  
Acer poliophyllum 
Acer pseudoplatanus 
Acer pseudosieboldianum  
Acer pseudowilsonii  
Acer pubipalmatum 
Acer pycnanthum

Species R

†Acer republicense 
Acer robustum
†Acer rousei   
Acer rubescens  
Acer rubronervium  
Acer rubrum 
Acer rufinerve

Species S

Acer saccharinum 
Acer saccharum  
Acer salweenense 
Acer schneiderianum 
Acer sempervirens  
Acer shangszeense 
Acer shenkanense 
Acer shensiense  
Acer shihweii  
Acer shirasawanum  
Acer sichourense 
Acer sieboldianum  
Acer sikkimense  
Acer sino-oblongum  
Acer sinopurpurascens
†Acer smileyi   
Acer spicatum
 †Acer spitzi 
Acer stachyophyllum  
Acer sterculiaceum
†Acer stewarti  
†Acer stonebergae    
Acer sutchuenense  
Acer sycopseoides

Species T

†Acer taggarti 
Acer taipuense  
Acer tataricum
†Acer taurocursum  
Acer tegmentosum  
Acer tenellum  
Acer tibetense
Acer tonkinense 
†Acer toradense 
†Acer traini 
Acer trialatum 
Acer tricaudatum 
Acer triflorum 
Acer truncatum  
Acer tschonoskii  
Acer turcomanicum 
Acer tutcheri

Species U-Z

Acer undulatum  
Acer velutinum 
Acer wangchii  
Acer wardii  
†Acer washingtonense 
†Acer whitebirdense 
Acer wuyishanicum  
Acer wuyuanense 
Acer yangbiense  
Acer yaoshanicum  
Acer yinkunii  
Acer yui

Species listed by section and series

Infrageneric classification of extant species follows The Maple Society (E. Davis), 2021.

Section Acer

  Series Acer
 Acer caesium Wall. ex Brandis
 Acer heldreichii Orph. ex Boiss.
 Acer pseudoplatanus L.
 Acer sosnowskyi Duloch
 Acer velutinum Boiss.
 Acer yangbiense Chen & Yang
  Series Monspessulana
 Acer granatense Boissier
 Acer hyrcanum Fisch. & Meyer
 Acer iranicum Mohtashamian & Rastegar
 Acer mazandaranicum H.Zare & Assad
 Acer monspessulanum L.
 Acer obtusifolium Sibthorp & Smith
 Acer opalus Miller
 Acer sempervirens L.
 Acer undulatum Pojark
  Series Saccharodendron
 Acer binzayedii Vargas-Rodriguez
 Acer floridanum (Chapm.) Pax 
 Acer grandidentatum Torr. & Gray
 Acer leucoderme Small 
 Acer nigrum Michx.f.
 Acer saccharum Marshall
 Acer skutchii Rehder

Section †Alaskana

 †Acer alaskense Wolfe & Tanai  (Late Paleocene, Matanuska River Valley, Alaska)

Section Arguta

 Acer acuminatum Wall. ex D.Don
 Acer argutum Maxim. – deep-veined maple
 Acer barbinerve Maxim. – bearded maple
 †Acer ivanofense Wolfe & Tanai (Late Eocene to Early Oligocene, Meshik Volcanics, Alaska)
 Acer stachyophyllum Hiern – birch-leaved maple

Section †Douglasa

 †Acer douglasense Wolfe & Tanai (Early Eocene, Cape Douglas, Alaska)

Section Ginnala

 †Acer ashwilli Wolfe & Tanai (Early Oligocene, Central Oregon)
 Acer ginnala Maxim. – Amur maple
 Acer tataricum L. – Tatar maple

Section Glabra

  Series Glabra
 Acer glabrum Torr. – Douglas maple, Rocky Mountain maple, Greene's maple, New Mexico maple, Torrey maple
 Series incertae sedis
 †Acer traini Wolfe & Tanai (Early to middle Miocene, Western North America)

Section Indivisa

  Series Indivisa
 Acer carpinifolium Siebold & Zucc. – hornbeam maple

Section Lithocarpa

  Series Lithocarpa
 Acer diabolicum Blume ex Koch – horned maple
 Acer kungshanense W. P. Fang & C. Y. Chang
 Acer leipoense Fang & Soong
 Acer lungshengense W. P. Fang & L. C. Hu
 Acer sinopurpurascens Cheng
 Acer sterculiaceum Wall. – Franchet’s maple, Himalayan maple
 Acer thomsonii Miquel
 Acer tsinglingense W. P. Fang & C. C. Hsieh

Section Macrantha

 Acer capillipes Maxim.
 †Acer castorrivularis Wolfe & Tanai (Late Eocene, Beaver Creek Flora)
 Acer caudatifolium Hayata
 Acer chienii Hu & Cheng
 †Acer clarnoense Wolfe & Tanai (Late Eocene, John Day Formation)
 Acer crataegifolium Siebold & Zucc.
 Acer davidii Franch. 
 †Acer dettermani Wolfe & Tanai (Late Eocene - Early Oligocene, Meshik Volcanics)
 Acer forrestii Diels 
 Acer hookeri Miq. 
 Acer insulare Makino 
 Acer kawakamii Koidz. 
 Acer komarovii Pojark in Komarov 
 †Acer latahense Wolfe & Tanai (Early - Late Miocene, Latah, Mascall, and Succor Creek Formations)
 Acer laxiflorum Pax in Engler 
 Acer maximowiczii Pax
 Acer metcalfii Rehder
 Acer micranthum Siebold & Zucc.
 Acer morifolium Koidz.
 †Acer palaeorufinerve Tanai & Onoe (Miocene to Pliocene, East Asia & Alaska)
 Acer pectinatum Wall. ex Nicholson
 Acer pensylvanicum L.
 Acer rubescens Hayata
 Acer rufinerve Siebold & Zucc.
 Acer sikkimense Miq.
 Acer tegmentosum Maxim.
 Acer tschonoskii Murray

Section Macrophylla

 Acer macrophyllum Pursh – Oregon maple, bigleaf maple

Section Negundo

  Series Negundo
 †Acer eonegundo Wolfe & Tanai (Middle - Late Eocene, Nevada)
 Acer negundo L. – box elder, boxelder maple, Manitoba maple

  Series Cissifolia
 Acer cissifolium (Siebold & Zucc.) Koch
 Acer henryi Pax 
 †Acer lincolnense Wolfe & Tanai (late Eocene, Beaver Creek Flora, Montana)

Section Palmata

  Series Palmata
 Acer amoenum (Carriere) Hara
 Acer anhweiense Fang & Fang f.
 Acer calcaratum Gagnep.
 Acer campbellii Hook.f. & Thomson ex Hiern – Campbell's maple
 Acer chingii Hu
 Acer circinatum Pursh – vine maple
 Acer confertifolium Merril & Metcalf
 Acer duplicatoserratum Hayata
 Acer elegantulum Fang & Chiu
 Acer erianthum Schwer.
 Acer fenzelianum Hand.-Mazz. – Fenzl's maple
 Acer flabellatum Rehder
 Acer heptaphlebium Gagnepain
 Acer japonicum Thunb. – downy Japanese maple
 Acer kuomeii Fang & Fang f.
 Acer kweilinense Fang & Fang f.
 Acer miaoshanicum Fang
 Acer oliverianum Pax – Oliver's maple
 Acer osmastonii Gamble
 Acer palmatum Thunb. – Japanese maple
 Acer pauciflorum Fang
 Acer pseudosieboldianum (Pax) Komarov - Korean maple
 Acer pseudowilsonii Y.S.Chen
 Acer pubinerve Rehder
 Acer pubipalmatum Fang
 Acer robustum Pax
 Acer serrulatum Hayata
 Acer shirasawanum Koidz. – Shirasawa's maple
 Acer sieboldianum Miq. – Siebold's maple
 Acer sinense Pax – Campbell's maple
 Acer takesimense Nakai
 Acer tenuifolium (Koidzumi) Koidzumi
 Acer tonkinense Lecompte
 Acer tutcheri Duthie
 Acer wangchii Fang
 Acer wilsonii Rehder – Wilson's maple
  Series Penninervia
 Acer cordatum Pax
 Acer crassum Chu & Cheng
 Acer erythranthum Gagnep.
 Acer fabri Hance
 Acer hilaense Hu & Cheng
 Acer kwangnanense Hu & Cheng
 Acer laevigatum Hu & Cheng – # smoothbark maple
 Acer oligocarpum 
 Acer pubipetiolatum Hu & W.C.Cheng
 Acer sino-oblongum Metcalf
 Acer wangchii Fang

Section Parviflora

  Series Distyla
 Acer distylum Siebold & Zucc. – lime-leaved maple
  Series Parviflora
 Acer nipponicum Hara – Nippon maple
 Series incertae sedis
 †Acer browni Wolfe & Tanai (Early-Middle Miocene; Washington, Oregon, British Columbia)
 †Acer smileyi Wolfe & Tanai (late Oligocene-Middle Miocene; Alaska, Idaho, Oregon, Nevada)

Section Pentaphylla 

  Series Pentaphylla
 Acer pentaphyllum Diels
  Series Trifida (syn Section integrifolia)
 Acer albopurpurascens Hayata
 Acer buergerianum Miq. – trident maple
 Acer chiangdaoense Santisuk
 Acer coriaceifolium Lév. - # leatherleaf maple
 Acer gracilifolium Fang & Fu
 Acer lucidum Metcalf
 Acer oblongum Wall. ex DC. - #
 Acer paihengii Fang
 Acer paxii Franch. - #
 Acer poliophyllum Fang & Wu
 Acer shihweii Chun & Fang
 Acer sycopseoides Chun
 Acer wangchii Fang
 Acer yinkunii Fang
 Acer yui Fang

Section Platanoidea

  Series Platanoidea
 Acer acutum Fang
 Acer amplum Rehder – broad maple
 Acer campestre L. – field maple
 Acer cappadocicum Gled. – Cappadocian maple
 Acer chunii Fang
 Acer divergens Koch ex Pax
 Acer fulvescens Rehder in Sargent
 Acer lobelii Ten. – Lobel's maple
 Acer longipes Franch. ex Rehder
 Acer miaotaiense P.C.Tsoong
 Acer miyabei Maxim. – Miyabe's maple
 Acer okamotoanum Nakai
 Acer pictum Thunberg 
 Acer platanoides L. – Norway maple
 Acer shenkanense Fang ex Fu
 Acer tenellum Pax
 Acer tibetense Fang
 Acer truncatum Bunge – Shandong maple
 Acer turkestanicum Pax in Engler

Section Pubescentia

  Series Pubescentia
 Acer pentapomicum Stewart ex Brandis
 Acer pilosum Maximowicz

Section †Republica

 †Acer republicense Wolfe & Tanai (Early Eocene, Washington state)

Section †Rousea

 †Acer rousei Wolfe & Tanai (Early Eocene, British Columbia)

Section Rubra

 †Acer chaneyi Knowlton (Oligocene to Miocene, Western US)
 †Acer ferrignoi Wolfe & Tanai (Late Miocene, Oregon)
 †Acer kenaicum Wolfe & Tanai (Oligocene, Kenai group, Alaska)
 Acer laurinum Hassk. - #
 Acer pycnanthum K.Koch
 Acer rubrum L. – red maple
 Acer saccharinum L. – silver maple
 †Acer taggarti Wolfe & Tanai (Middle Miocene, Mascall Formation, Oregon)
 †Acer taurocursum Wolfe & Tanai (Late Eocene, Bull Run, Nevada)
 †Acer whitebirdense (Ashlee) Wolfe & Tanai (Middle Miocene, Northwestern USA)

Section Spicata

 Acer caudatum Wall. – tail-leaf maple
 Acer spicatum Lamarck – mountain maple
 Acer ukurunduense Trautvetter & Meyer

Section †Stewarta

 †Acer hillsi Wolfe & Tanai (Early Eocene, Washington state)
 †Acer stewarti Wolfe & Tanai (Early Eocene, British Columbia)

Section †Spitza

 †Acer spitzi Wolfe & Tanai (Early Eocene, Washington state)

Section †Torada

 †Acer stonebergae Wolfe & Tanai (Early Eocene, Washington State & British Columbia)
 †Acer toradense Wolfe & Tanai (Early Eocene, Washington State & British Columbia)
 †Acer washingtonense Wolfe & Tanai (Early Eocene, Washington State)

Section Trifoliata

 Series Emeiensia
 Acer sutchuenense Franch.
 Series Grisea
 Acer griseum (Franch.) Pax – paperbark maple
 Acer maximowiczianum Miq. – Nikko maple
 Acer triflorum Komarov – three-flowered maple
 Series Mandshurica
 Acer mandshuricum Maxim. – Manchurian maple

Section Wardiana

 Acer wardii W.W.Smith

Hybrids

Acer × bormuelleri Borbas (A. monspessulanum × A. campestre or A. opalus)
Acer × boscii Spach (A. monspessulanum × A. tataricum or A. pensylvanicum × A. tataricum, possibly A. tataricum  × A. campestre)
Acer × conspicuum van Gelderen & Otterdoom (A. davidii × A. pensylvanicum)
Acer × coriaceum Bosc ex Tausch (A. monspessulanum × A. opalus ssp. obtusatum)
Acer × dieckii van Gelderen & Otterdoom See A. platanoides
Acer × freemanii Murray (A. rubrum × A. saccharinum)
Acer × hillieri Lancaster (A. miyabei × A. cappadocicum 'Aureum')
Acer × martinii Jordan (A. monspessulanum × A. opalus)
Acer × pseudo-heldreichii Fukarek & Celjo (A. pseudoplatanus × A. heldreichii)
Acer × ramosum Jordan (A. monspessulanum × A. opalus)
Acer × schwerinii Pax (uncertain, maybe A. crataegifolium × A. rufinerve)
Acer × zoeschense Pax (A. campestre × either A. cappadocicum or A. lobelii)

Notes

References

 

List
Acer
Acer species